The Suit (Russian: Шик) is a 2003 film by Bakhtyar Khudojnazarov with collaboration from Russia, Ukraine, Germany and France. The film script is written by Oleg Antonov and is a free adaption of Ray Bradbury's 1958 short story The Wonderful Ice Cream Suit.

Plot summary
Three youngster living in a small coastal town at the Black Sea spend their time roving about. Some day they discover a black pinstriped Gucci suit in the window of a fashion shop in the big city, where they have to go by ferry. They plan to obtain this specific suit in order to appear as successful and confident adults once they wear it. After a couple of efforts, they manage to acquire the suit and agree to take turns wearing it.

Shtyr puts the suit on to upgrade his image. Wearing the suit, he easily creeps into the champagne reception of a luxury cruise ship, and later he tries to have a talk with his father, who left the family long ago and works as a sophisticated tailor in town.

Geka wears the suit hoping to gain respect from his step mother Asya, who apparently is cheating his father by dating other guys. On the one hand he detests Asya for her more or less obvious sluttishness, on the other hand he appears to be attracted by her.

Mute uses the suit to impress Dina, a beautiful jewish fishmonger he became fond of, but is only used by her in order to get rid of a bothersome man named Artur.

The efforts of all three juveniles wearing the suit end in tragedy.

Filming location 
The Suit was shot in the Crimea in the cities of Sevastopol and Jalta and the surrounding areas. The opening scene takes place in the cave fortress of Inkerman.

Cast
Ivan Kokorin as Mute
Aleksandr Yatsenko as Shtyr
Artur Smolyaninov as Geka
Ingeborga Dapkūnaitė as Asya
Ruslana Rukhadze as Dina
Andrei Panin as Platon (Shtyr's father)
Elena Drobysheva as Shtyr's mother 
Nikolai Fomenko as Botya
Inna Sukharev as Mona Lisa (Botya's playmate)
Aleksandr Donskoy as Edik

Release 
The premiere of  Shik  was on February 9, 2003 at the Berlinale Talents in Germany. In Russia, the film was first shown on 23 July 2003 at the Moscow International Film Festival.

Awards 
2002 Sochi Grand Prize (Best Russian Film)
2003 Tokyo Special Jury Prize: Best Artistic Contribution

References

External links

Review on KinoKultura
Russian Cinema

2003 films
2000s Russian-language films
Russian comedy-drama films
Films shot in Crimea
Films directed by Bakhtyar Khudojnazarov